Tullio Camillotti (29 January 1880 – 21 February 1959) was a heavyweight Italian weightlifter who competed at the 1906 Intercalated Games. He won a silver medal in the one hand lift and finished seventh in the two hand lift. After graduating in law from the University of Padua he retired from competitions.

References

1880 births
1959 deaths
Weightlifters at the 1906 Intercalated Games
Italian male weightlifters
Medalists at the 1906 Intercalated Games
University of Padua alumni
People from Sacile
Sportspeople from Friuli-Venezia Giulia
19th-century Italian people
20th-century Italian people